Pozořice is a market town in Brno-Country District in the South Moravian Region of the Czech Republic. It has about 2,300 inhabitants.

Twin towns – sister cities

Pozořice is twinned with:
 Ivanka pri Dunaji, Slovakia

References

Populated places in Brno-Country District
Market towns in the Czech Republic